Gedion Appollis also known as Piet Appollis (born 1975) is an international lawn bowler from Namibia.

Bowls career
Appollis represented Namibia at the 2014 Commonwealth Games

In 2019 he won the triples bronze medal at the Atlantic Bowls Championships.

References

Namibian bowls players
Living people
1975 births